The 2017 Census of Pakistan was a detailed enumeration of the Pakistani population which began on 15 March 2017 and ended on 25 May 2017. It was the first census taken in the country in the 21st century, nineteen years after the previous one in 1998, and it was carried out by the Pakistan Bureau of Statistics.

The census recorded a total population throughout the country of 213,222,917. The results showed a massive population increase having occurred between 1998 and 2017 of 77.0 Million people, or an increase of +56.5%. The results also marked a significant overperformance compared to estimations made of the Pakistani population before the census, which had previously estimated the Pakistani population in 2017 to be 195 Million – 200 Million.

Controversies regarding this census, focused around the populations of Pakistan's largest city, Karachi and the province of Sindh, resulted in another census being scheduled early in the year 2023, with the results of that census being used to delimitate constituencies for the 2023 Pakistani general election.

Design

The 2017 Census of Pakistan was conducted by over 110,000 civilian staff along with security provided by over 200,000 personnel from the Pakistan Army. Its budget was 18.5 Billion Pakistani Rupees, of which 6.0 Billion went to the armed forces, 6.5 billion was assigned for transportation and other related expenses, and 6.0 Billion was spent on training and re-enumeration. Many questions were asked of each individual, most importantly: age, sex, marital status, religion, mother tongue, nationality, educational attainment, literacy, and employment status. Data was also collected regarding every single household in the country, such as the tenure, the building material, the year of construction, the source of water, and the source of light.

It also was conducted in 2 phases. The first phase lasted from 15 March 2017 to 13 April 2017 and covered 53 districts of the country. The second phase began on 25 April 2017 and lasted until 24 May 2017 covering the remaining 88 districts. However, the census in the Islamabad Capital Territory and neighbouring districts of Attock and Rawalpindi, although included in the second phase, began on 30 March 2017 and concluded on 23 May 2017. Furthermore, for administrative purposes, the census in the Kech District of Balochistan was spread over both phases. In certain, "snowbound" areas of Khyber Pakhtunkhwa, the enumeration took place in June 2017.

Results

While basic provisional results of the 2017 Census of Pakistan were released in late 2017 and early 2018, the final results of the census were publicly released throughout the spring and summer of 2021, and they showed that in 2017, Pakistan had 213.2 Million residents. Data for Azad Kashmir and Gilgit-Baltistan was disseminated separately by the territories' own statistical agencies.

City 
The population of 10 major cities of the country has increased by 74.4 percent since 1998, when the last census was conducted, according to the data of recently concluded 6th Population and Housing Census 2017.

The total population of the 10 cities surged to 40,956,232 individuals as per the 2017 census from 23,475,067 registered during the 1998 census, the data revealed.

Population Pyramids 

Population Pyramids of each Pakistani province and nationwide as of the 2017 Pakistan Census.

Controversies

Sindh population
The Sindh Assembly refused to accept the results of the 2017 census, stating that millions of people were shown with double addresses and counted in their home provinces despite living and working in Sindh. In April 2018, Mustafa Kamal, chairman of the Pak Sarzameen Party and former Mayor of Karachi, challenged the results of the 2017 census in the Supreme Court, seeking a third-party audit of the national census. Kamal pleaded that records from the National Database and Registration Authority (NADRA) showed the population of Karachi to be 20.15 million, rather than 16 million as shown in the census.

FATA population
Shahab Uddin Khan, a Member of the National Assembly (MNA) from Bajaur Agency, has stated he believes that a large number of people displaced from the Mamund and Nawagai regions due to security operations have not been counted by the census. He has stated he intends to challenge the census in court. Bismillah Khan, an MNA from Bajaur Agency, has stated he believes the population of the Federally Administered Tribal Areas is double of what is reflected in the census. He added that he will take up the issue with the federal government along with other lawmakers. Sajid Hussain Turi, an MNA from Khyber Agency, claimed that more than three million people from FATA are living in other cities in the country due to military operations, and expressed concern that developmental work in the region could be underfunded if the population is underestimated by the census.

Political opposition
Syed Khurshid Ahmed Shah of the Pakistan Peoples Party (PPP), Former Leader of the Opposition in the National Assembly, questioned the provisional census results. He issued a statement demanding that data collected by the statistics division should be compared to data from the Pakistan Army. PPP leader Nawab Muhammad Yousuf accused authorities of doctoring the results, alleging that the population of Sindh had been intentionally underestimated by at least 10 million and the population of Punjab had been overestimated by 10 million. He described the results as an attempt to usurp the rights of Sindh. PPP Senator Mukhtiar Ahmed Dhamrah disputed the population of Karachi and Lahore reported in the preliminary results.

Bushra Gohar, leader of Awami National Party (ANP), pointed out in a tweet that the reported population of around 5 million for the Federally Administered Tribal Areas seems contradictory to the fact that there have been nearly 2 million internally displaced persons registered from North Waziristan alone.

Chief Census Commissioner Asif Bajwa rejected allegations that the census results had been manipulated and that the population of Karachi had been intentionally understated. He stated that the populations of Karachi and Lahore were counted as per the record of national identity cards and voter lists and that the census data had already been verified with statistics recorded by the army.

Religious demographics

Pakistan Bureau of Statistics released religious data of Pakistan Census 2017 on 19 May 2021. 96.47% are Muslims, followed by 2.14% Hindus, 1.27% Christians, 0.09% Ahmadis and 0.02% others.

These are some maps of religious minority groups. The 2017 census showed an increasing share in Hinduism, mainly caused by a higher birth rate among the impoverished Hindus of Sindh province. This census also recorded Pakistan's first Hindu-majority district, called Umerkot District, where Muslims were previously the majority.

On the other hand, Christianity in Pakistan, while increasing in raw numbers, has fallen significantly in percentage terms since the last census. This is due to Pakistani Christians having a significantly lower fertility rate than Pakistani Muslims and Pakistani Hindus as well as them being concentrated in the most developed parts of Pakistan, Lahore District (over 5% Christian), Islamabad Capital Territory (over 4% Christian), and Northern Punjab.

The Ahmadiyya movement shrunk in size (both raw numbers and percentage) between 1998 and 2017, while remaining concentrated in Lalian Tehsil, Chiniot District, where approximately 13% of the population is Ahmadiyya.

Here are some maps of Pakistan's religious minority groups as of the 2017 census by district:

Virtually all people not belonging to one of these minority groups were Sunni or Shia Muslim, with the most religiously homogeneous areas found in Khyber Pakhtunkhwa.

Language demographics

Pakistan Bureau of Statistics released language data of Pakistan Census 2017 on 19 May 2021. 7.08% of the Pakistani people mentioned Urdu as their mother language, 38.78%Punjabi, 14.57% Sindhi, 18.24% Pashto, 3.02% Balochi, 0.17% Kashmiri, 12.19% Seraiki, 2.44% Hindko, 1.24% Brahui and 2.26% others.

Security incidents 
 21 March 2017 – a census team came under attack from villagers in the Gandheri area of Nowshera. The aggressors were apprehended and their arms were confiscated.
 25 March 2017 – a policeman deputed on census team's security in Charsadda was injured when he was fired at by an attacker. In retaliatory fire, the miscreant was injured and arrested.
 5 April 2017 – a census team was targeted in a suicide attack on Lahore's Bedian Road. 7 members of the team were slain – including two enumerators and 5 army personnel on security and reconnaissance duty.
 25 April 2017 – a Levies personnel providing security to the census team was killed while another was injured as they came under attack from gunmen in Kallag Kollanch area of Gwadar. Balochistan Liberation Front claimed responsibility for the attack.
 26 April 2017 – a passenger van carrying civilians and a census team hit a land-mine in Kurram Agency. 14 civilians were killed while 9 people were injured, among them 2 census workers and 4 Khasadar officials.
 5 May 2017 – a census team performing its duties in villages in Chaman near the Afghan-Pakistan border was unilaterally attacked by Afghan forces. Two security personnel with the team were killed along with 10 civilians.

See also 
Census in Pakistan
Demographics of Pakistan

Notes

References

Demographics of Pakistan
Censuses in Pakistan
2017 in Pakistan
Pakistan